Ruellia stenandrium is a plant native to the Cerrado vegetation of Brazil.

stenandrium
Flora of Brazil